Parinari curatellifolia is an evergreen tropical tree of Africa, found in various kinds of deciduous woodland most frequently in poorly drained areas and inland at moderate altitudes. It is also known as mmupudu (by Tswana speaking South Africans), mupundu or mobola plum after the fruit, which is considered tasty and causes the tree to be spared when woodland is cleared for cultivation.

It grows in the Guinea Savanna region of West Africa from Senegal across to Chad and then in seasonal woodland across the Equator through Kenya and the eastern side of the continent in deciduous Miombo woodland inland to Zambia and Zimbabwe. Its southernmost reach is just outside the tropics in South Africa, at about 25°S.

Appearance
Over its great range the tree varies a good deal in appearance. The branches are heavy and may droop or grow erect, giving the tree an impressive shape. When rainfall is less it adopts a mushroom shape and usually grows up to 15m only. It can be locally common and at moderately high altitudes in south central Africa it is sometimes the dominant tree in the woodland in a type of closed woodland where the soil is very poorly drained and may be sodden for several months of the year.

It has rough, cork-like bark, stiff leather-like leaves which have grey hairs on the underside. The edible fruits are plum-like, which turn yellow-brown when ripe.

Uses
A traditional food plant in Africa, this little-known fruit has potential to improve nutrition, boost food security, foster rural development and support sustainable landcare.
The wood is very hard and heavy, as it contains silica crystals, therefore it is difficult to work but unfortunately is not durable and so is little used, although it makes good charcoal. However, the main value of the tree is the delicious fruit, which appears early in the dry season and can be harvested over 3 or more months. It is used a snack and the kernel has a high oil content. The crushed pulp of the fruit is an ingredient in drinks and since it ferments well, is often used to make alcoholic drinks as well.

It is also used for faith healing by some indigenous churches in Zimbabwe.

References 

van Wyk, B. and van Wyk, P. 1997. Field Guide to trees of South Africa. Struik, Cape Town

External links

Fruits originating in Africa
curatellifolia